The 1999 Women's Hockey Asia Cup was the fourth edition of the Women's Hockey Asia Cup. It was held in New Delhi, India from 1 December to 10 December 1999.

South Korea won the title, with India finishing second while China took the third place.

Teams

Results

Table

Matches

First to sixth place classification

Fifth place game

Third place game

Final

Winners

Final standings

References

International women's field hockey competitions hosted by India
Women's Hockey Asia Cup
Asia Cup
Women's Hockey Asia Cup
Hockey Asia Cup